Dil Pardesi Ho Gayaa (My Heart Became a Stranger) is a 2003 Indian Hindi language romantic drama movie directed by Saawan Kumar Tak.

Cast
 Kapil Jhaveri as Salman 'Sunny'
 Saloni Aswani as Ruksar Khan 
 Amrish Puri as Brig. Sarfaroz Khan
 Ashutosh Rana as Major Ramesh Bilal
 Mukesh Rishi as Tabrez Baig
 Prem Chopra as Muslim Priest
 Raza Murad as Indian Army Brigadier Gill
 Mushtaq Khan as Khushmisaz
 Yunus Parvez as Ramzan Khan
 Navni Parihar as Niharika Ghatge 
 Ghanshyam Rohera as Waiter (Ghanshyam)
 Sanjay Sharma as Capt Nasir Khan

Plot 
Major Ram is one of the few soldiers from the Indian Army who have been held captive in Pakistan, following the war with India. The Indian army and politicians are unable to make any decision so as not to jeopardize the lives of the captives. Major Ram's brother, Arjun, alias Sunny decides to take it upon himself to enter Pakistan and get his brother free. He now calls himself Salman. On the way he meets with beautiful Ruksar and both fall in love with each other. Unfortunately for them, they cannot be married, so they elope, leading to an unrest within their community, and a hunt is on for them. Salman and Ruksar chance upon the prison camp that is housing Ram, and do get him free, only to find themselves trapped by Pakistani soldiers.

Soundtrack
Dil Pardesi Ho Gayaa (2003) music album contained 9 Songs. All music was composed by Usha Khanna. Lyrics were penned by Saawan Kumaar. Last film of Usha Khanna as a composer.

References

External links 

2003 films
2000s Hindi-language films
2003 romantic drama films
Films scored by Usha Khanna
Films directed by Saawan Kumar Tak
Indian romantic drama films